Princess Gabriella, Countess of Carladès (Gabriella Thérèse Marie Grimaldi; born 10 December 2014), is the daughter of Prince Albert II and Princess Charlene. She is second in the line of succession to the Monegasque throne, behind her twin brother, Hereditary Prince Jacques.

Birth and christening 

On 30 May 2014, it was announced that Princess Charlene was pregnant. After much speculation it was confirmed, on 9 October 2014, that the couple was expecting twins by the end of the year. On 21 November 2014, the palace announced that each twin would have the right to a salvo of 21 cannon shots at birth. Forty-two cannon shots (21 for each child) were to be fired from the Fort Antoine and church bells were to be rung for fifteen minutes. In addition, the day would be declared a holiday.

On 10 December 2014, Princess Gabriella was born at Monaco's Princess Grace Hospital Centre, followed two minutes later by her brother, Hereditary Prince Jacques. She was granted the title  Countess of Carladès by her father. On 7 January 2015, the children were presented to the Monegasque people.

Gabriella has an older half-sister, Jazmin Grace Grimaldi, and an older half-brother, Alexandre Grimaldi-Coste, from her father's previous relationships.

Gabriella and Jacques were baptised at the Saint Nicholas Cathedral, Monaco on 10 May 2015. At this occasion, she was awarded the Grand Officer of the Order of Grimaldi.

Titles and honours

: 
 Grand Officer of the Order of Grimaldi (10 May 2015).

Her full title and style is: Her Serene Highness Princess Gabriella of Monaco, Countess of Carladès.

References 

|-

2014 births
Living people
House of Grimaldi
French countesses
Monegasque people of American descent
Monegasque princesses
People of Ligurian descent
Royal children
Monagesque twins
Recipients of the Order of Grimaldi
Daughters of monarchs